The Agatu attacks and massacres occurred in Agatu, Benue State, began in late February 2016 and continued for several days into March.

Background
Agatu is in the State of Benue close to Nigeria's centre, where several different ethnic groups meet.

Possible motives and causes
It is believed that the attack was committed in retaliation for the killing of the Fulanis' cows.

Former Senate President David Mark also pointed out that the Benue South senatorial district were his constituents and hinted at a possible political motivation for these attacks.

Aftermath

According to the Nigerian politician Senator David Mark, over 500 have been killed. However, this number has been disputed. The Inspector General of Police (IGP) said as reported by Punch Nigeria newspaper that "I was around, I travelled to Benue State, I did not see where 300 people were buried."

Afterwards, several small scale attacks continued through Benue State and central Nigeria.

Senator Mark later claimed he was fortunate to escape an ambush by suspected assailants, on a condolence visit to the area.

President Buhari and members of the Nigerian security apparatus were criticised for their handling of the situation.

2018
Tragedy struck again on 4 March 2018 in Omusu village, Ojigo ward in Edumoga, Okpokwu local government area of Benue State as suspected herdsmen unleash terror of their victims leaving 26 people, including and children, dead just a day after president Muhammad Buhari promise to visit the state.

References

External links 
 Fulani herdsmen’s mindless Agatu killings, The Punch Nigeria.
 Reign Of Terror In Agatu: The Untold Story

Fulani herdsmen attacks
Massacres in 2016
2010s massacres in Nigeria
2016 in Nigeria